The Netherlands Football League Championship 1924–1925 was contested by 51 teams participating in five divisions. The national champion would be determined by a play-off featuring the winners of the eastern, northern, southern and two western football divisions of the Netherlands. HBS Craeyenhout won this year's championship by beating NAC, Sparta Rotterdam, Go Ahead and LAC Frisia 1883.

New entrants
Eerste Klasse East:
Promoted from 2nd Division: FC Wageningen
Eerste Klasse North:
Promoted from 2nd Division: GVV Groningen
Eerste Klasse South:
Promoted from 2nd Division: De Valk
Eerste Klasse West-I:
Moving in from West-II: Ajax Sportman Combinatie, Blauw-Wit Amsterdam, HFC Haarlem, HC & CV Quick and Sparta Rotterdam
Promoted from 2nd Division: GVV Unitas
Eerste Klasse West-II:
Moving in from West-I: AFC Ajax, DFC, HVV Den Haag, RCH and VOC
Promoted from 2nd Division: HFC EDO

Divisions

Eerste Klasse East

Eerste Klasse North

Eerste Klasse South

Eerste Klasse West-I

Eerste Klasse West-II

Championship play-off

References
RSSSF Netherlands Football League Championships 1898-1954
RSSSF Eerste Klasse Oost
RSSSF Eerste Klasse Noord
RSSSF Eerste Klasse Zuid
RSSSF Eerste Klasse West

Netherlands Football League Championship seasons
1924–25 in Dutch football
Netherlands